Labrosse is a former commune in the Loiret department in north-central France. On 1 January 2016, it was merged into the new commune of Le Malesherbois.

See also
Communes of the Loiret department

References

Former communes of Loiret